A Semantic Service Oriented Architecture (SSOA) is an architecture that allows for scalable and controlled Enterprise Application Integration solutions. SSOA describes an approach to enterprise-scale IT infrastructure. It leverages rich, machine-interpretable descriptions of data, services, and processes to enable software agents to autonomously interact to perform critical mission functions. SSOA is technically founded on three notions:

 The principles of Service-oriented architecture (SOA);
 Standard Based Design (SBD); and
 Semantics-based computing.

SSOA combines and implements these computer science concepts into a robust, extensible architecture capable of enabling complex, powerful functions.

Applications 
In the health care industry, SSOA of HL7 has long been implemented.  Other protocols include LOINC, PHIN, and HIPAA related standards.  There is a series of SSOA-related ISO standards published for financial services, which can be found at the ISO's website,,. Some financial sectors also adopt EMV standards to facilitate European consumers.  A part of SSOA on transport and trade are in the ISO sections of 03.220.20 and 35.240.60,.  Some general guidelines of the technology and the standards in other fields are partially located at 25.040.40, 35.240.99,,.

See also
 Cyber security standards
 ISO/IEC 7816
 ISO 8583
 ISO/IEC 8859
 ISO 9241
 ISO 9660
 ISO/IEC 11179
 ISO/IEC 15408
 ISO/IEC 17799
 ISO/IEC 27000-series
 Service component architecture
 Semantic web
 EMML
 Business Intelligence 2.0 (BI 2.0)

References

External links
 OSGi Alliance

Web services
Semantic Web
Enterprise application integration
Service-oriented (business computing)
Software architecture